Fivemilebourne is a townland located in County Leitrim, Ireland.

References 

Towns and villages in County Leitrim